2011 Malta Open is a darts tournament, which took place in Buġibba, Malta in 2011.

Results

References

2011 in darts
2011 in Maltese sport
Darts in Malta
St. Paul's Bay